Hrytsiv is an urban-type settlement in Shepetivka Raion (district) of the Khmelnytskyi Oblast in western Ukraine. It hosts the administration of Hrytsiv settlement hromada, one of the hromadas of Ukraine. The settlement's population was 4,056 as of the 2001 Ukrainian Census and 

The settlement was founded in 1230. It received the status of an urban-type settlement in 1959.

References

Urban-type settlements in Shepetivka Raion
Volhynian Governorate
Populated places established in the 1230s
1230 establishments in Europe